Myanmar Paralympic Sports Federation is the national level body representing Myanmar in Paralympic Games.It is a sports federation for the disabled under the Myanmar Olympic Committee. Unlike other countries, there is no National Paralympic Committee, only the Sports Federation, which is under the Olympic Committee.Work is underway to form a Myanmar Paralympic Committee. The Sports Federation is located at Aung San Memorial Stadium, Yangon.

History
The Paralympic Sports Federation was formed in 1989 under the Ministry of Sports to enable people with disabilities to participate in sports and exercise in Myanmar.The Myanmar National Paralympic Games have been held annually since 1990. In 2014, a training camp for disabled was opened in North Dagon Township of Yangon Region.Myanmar hosted the 7th ASEAN Para Games in 2014.

Achievements
Myanmar athletes with disabilities have won medals in local competitions as well as international Games such as Summer Paralympics Games, Asian Para Games and ASEAN Para Games. As of 2018, 786 Medals were awarded from International Para Games.

Summer Paralympics

Asian Para Games

Asian Youth Para Games

ASEAN Para Games

See also
Myanmar at the Paralympics

References

Parasports organizations
Sports organizations established in 1989
Paralympic
1989 establishments in Myanmar